Space Launch System or variation, may refer to:

 a system for space launch, which include rocket and non-rocket systems
 a launch vehicle system, a rocket vehicle to launch material into orbit
 Space Launch System (NASA SLS), a NASA STS Space Shuttle replacement, super-heavy launcher
 Space Launch System (Turkey) (UFS), a satellite launcher from Turkey
 Space Launching System (USAF SLS), a 1960s U.S. Air Force launch vehicle family proposal

See also

 List of space launch system designs
 SLS (disambiguation)